Aligarh Muslim University Act was enacted in the year 1920 by the imperial legislation. The Act was amended in 1951 in order to do away with the Islamic teachings. The Act was amended in 1967 which was challenged in Azeez Basha case. In 2005 Allahabad High Court quashed Aligarh Muslim University Amendment Act, 1981, was unconstitutional and that the AMU was not a minority institution and, therefore, the notification issued by the Human Resource Development Ministry in February, permitting the university to reserve seats for Muslims in post-graduate medical courses was illegal.

Minority status 
The Act is more or less into limelight because of the debate on whether the Aligarh Muslim University was a minority status or not? It is under scrutiny of the Supreme Court of India. AMU was declared a minority institution by the AMU Amendment Act in 1981 by the Parliament.  The Allahabad High Court ruled in 2005 that AMU Amendment act of 1981 is unconstitutional.  The then UPA government went in appeal to Supreme Court.  However, the NDA Government has withdrawn this in 2016.

References 

Aligarh Muslim University
Acts of the Parliament of India
1920 in India
1920 in education
1920 in law
University-related legislation